The following lists events that happened during  1952 in New Zealand.

Summary

The population of New Zealand reaches 2 million.

Population
 Estimated population as of 31 December: 2,024,600
 Increase since 31 December 1951: 54,100 (2.75%)
 Males per 100 females: 101.1

Incumbents

Regal and viceregal
Head of State – George VI followed by Elizabeth II
Governor-General – Lieutenant-General The Lord Freyberg

Government
The 30th New Zealand Parliament continued. In power was the National government under Sidney Holland.

Speaker of the House – Mathew Oram
Prime Minister – Sidney Holland
Deputy Prime Minister – Keith Holyoake
Minister of Finance – Sidney Holland
Minister of Foreign Affairs – Clifton Webb
Chief Justice — Sir Humphrey O'Leary

Parliamentary opposition 
 Leader of the Opposition –   Walter Nash (Labour).

Main centre leaders
Mayor of Auckland – John Allum
Mayor of Hamilton – Harold David Caro
Mayor of Wellington – Robert Macalister
Mayor of Christchurch – Robert Macfarlane
Mayor of Dunedin – Leonard Morton Wright

Events

January

February
6 February – George VI dies and is succeeded by Elizabeth II as Queen of New Zealand

March

April

June

July

August

September

October

November

December

Arts and literature

See 1952 in art, 1952 in literature, :Category:1952 books

Music

See: 1952 in music

Radio

See: Public broadcasting in New Zealand

Film
Broken Barrier

See: :Category:1952 film awards, 1952 in film, List of New Zealand feature films, Cinema of New Zealand, :Category:1952 films

Sport

Athletics
 Jack Clarke wins his second national title in the men's marathon, clocking 2:38:42 on 1 March in Wanganui.

Chess
 The 59th National Chess Championship was held in Napier, and was won by Ortvin Sarapu of Christchurch (his first title).

Cricket
Various Tours, New Zealand cricket team

Horse racing

Harness racing
 New Zealand Trotting Cup – Mobile Globe
 Auckland Trotting Cup – Soangetaha (2nd win)

Lawn bowls
The national outdoor lawn bowls championships are held in Dunedin.
 Men's singles champion – Frank Livingstone (Onehunga Bowling Club)
 Men's pair champions – R.K. Aitchison, E. Ravenwood (skip) (North-East Valley Bowling Club)
 Men's fours champions – N.M. Johnston, W.J. Ashton, M.J. Squire, K.S. Ewing (skip) (Stratford Bowling Club)

Olympic Games

Summer Olympics

Winter Olympics

 New Zealand sends a team to the Winter Olympics for the first time.

Soccer
 The Chatham Cup was shared by the finalists North Shore United and Western (Christchurch) after the extra time score (1–1) and all criteria for deciding a winner at that time were equal.
 The national men's soccer team toured to the Pacific, playing 10 matches, 5 of which were internationals:
 31 August, Suva: NZ 1 – 0 Suva
 3 September, Suva: NZ 8 – 3 Southern Districts
 7 September, Suva: NZ 2 – 0 Fiji
 9 September, Lautoka: NZ 0 – 0 Lautoka
 11 September, Lautoka: NZ 5 – 0 Northern Districts
 14 September, Lautoka: NZ 9 – 0 Fiji
 16 September, Suva: NZ 5 – 2 Fiji
 21 September, Papeete: NZ 2 – 2 Tahiti
 25 September, Fautaua: NZ 7 – 1 Chinese Selection
 28 September, Papeete NZ 5 – 3 Tahiti
 Provincial league champions:
	Auckland:	Eastern Suburbs AFC
	Canterbury:	Technical OB
	Hawke's Bay:	West End
	Manawatu:	Palmerston North United
	Nelson:	Settlers
	Northland:	Otangarei United
	Otago:	Northern AFC
	Poverty Bay:	Thistle
	South Canterbury:	Thistle
	Southland:	Brigadiers
	Taranaki:	Overseas
	Waikato:	Pukemiro Junction
	Wairarapa:	Masterton B
	Wanganui:	Technical College Old Boys
	Wellington:	Petone

Births
 12 January: John Walker, athlete.
 4 February: Jenny Shipley Prime Minister.
 14 February: Les Wilson, field hockey goalkeeper.
 19 March: Warren Lees, cricket player and coach.
 22 March: Rod Millen, motor rally driver.
 7 April: Alan Niven, songwriter, record producer, manager.
 21 June: Jeremy Coney, cricket captain.
 25 June: Tim Finn, singer, songwriter and musician.
 20 July: Ian Ferguson, kayaker.
 8 August: Sandra Lee-Vercoe, politician and diplomat.
 2 September: Chris Knox, singer-songwriter.
 8 September: Graham Mourie, rugby player.
 14 September: Neil McLeod, field hockey player.
 3 October: Gary Troup, cricketer.
 20 October: Michael Houstoun, concert pianist.
 31 December: Vaughan Jones, mathematician.
 John Badcock, painter.
 Sue Bradford, politician.
 Stevan Eldred-Grigg, writer and historian.
 (in England): David Fletcher, cartoonist.
 Tame Iti, activist.
 Linda Jones (jockey), thoroughbred horse racing jockey
 Sukhi Turner, Mayor of Dunedin.
 Marilyn Waring, feminist academic and politician.

Deaths

 29 April: Adam Hamilton, politician.
 1 May: Hon. Thomas Otto Bishop MLC, politician.
 6 May: Sir Oswald Birley, painter (in England).
 5 August:John Robertson, politician. 
 13 August: Frederick de Jersey Clere, architect.
 20 August: Lionel Terry, convicted murderer, white supremacist.
 24 August: Alexander Harris, politician
 17 September Carl Axel Björk, whaler, goldminer and character.
 12 October: Te Puea Herangi, Māori leader.
 17 November: Ben Roberts, New Zealand Labour MP
 22 November: Ted Morgan, New Zealand boxer.
 27 November: Bill Parry, politician.

See also
List of years in New Zealand
Timeline of New Zealand history
History of New Zealand
Military history of New Zealand
Timeline of the New Zealand environment
Timeline of New Zealand's links with Antarctica

References

External links

 
Years of the 20th century in New Zealand